Adelle Tracey (born 27 May 1993) is an American-born middle-distance runner competing for Jamaica since 2022, having previously represented Great Britain, where she grew up. Tracey competes primarily in the 800 metres. She placed fourth in the event at the 2018 European Athletics Championships, but claimed a bronze in the North American equivalent, the 2022 NACAC Championships representing her new country, Jamaica. The following day, Tracey won silver for Jamaica in the 1500 metres event in the same championships.

Career
Tracey was one of the torchbearers at the 2012 Summer Olympics Opening Ceremony who, together with six other young British sport talents, lit the Olympic Cauldron. She was picked by Kelly Holmes. She is the second of the seven torchbearers to transfer allegiance after Katie Kirk, selected from Northern Ireland by Dame Mary Peters, transferred to Ireland.

Tracey won the British indoor 800 metres title in 2016, and went on to run a personal best of 2:00.04 on 7 September in Watford (mixed races). At the 2017 World Championships in London, she ran 2:00.28 in her heat to qualify for the semifinals, where she was sixth in 2:00.26. After finishing second in the 800m at the Athletics World Cup in London in July 2018, she went on to improve her 800m best by breaking the two-minute barrier for the first time with 1:59.86 in the semifinals at the European Championships in Berlin, going on to finish fourth in the final.

Her 800 metres personal best of 1:59.50 (Walnut, CA, May 2021) ranks her equal 18th on the UK all-time list. Her indoor best is 2:00.23 (Glasgow 2020).

On 9 November 2019, Adelle set the female course record at Cheltenham parkrun in 16:58.

In February 2022, she won her second national title after indoor 800m victory in 2016, contesting the 1500 metres at the British Indoor Championships.

On 28 June 2022, Tracey became eligible to race for Jamaica, and announced her transfer of allegiance on the same day.

Personal life
Tracey was born in the United States to a Jamaican father and English mother, and moved to England at the age of 7.

Competition record

References

1993 births
Living people
Sportspeople from Seattle
Jamaican female middle-distance runners
British female middle-distance runners
American female middle-distance runners
Jamaican people of English descent
English sportspeople of Jamaican descent
American sportspeople of Jamaican descent
American people of English descent
Alumni of Arts University Bournemouth
Athletes (track and field) at the 2018 Commonwealth Games
Olympic cauldron lighters
Competitors at the 2017 Summer Universiade
Commonwealth Games competitors for England